Shadow Mountain Community Church is a Baptist megachurch located in El Cajon, California, a city in San Diego county. It is affiliated with the Southern Baptist Convention.

History
The first meeting was held in 1909.  The church was founded in North Park, San Diego in 1912 as Scott Memorial Baptist Church, in memory of U.S. Army chaplain Winfield Scott. As SMBC grew, Scott Memorial East was established in El Cajon on Greenfield Drive. It was later renamed Shadow Mountain Community Church. The original Scott Memorial Baptist Church in North Park became Scott Memorial Community Church, then Grace Community Church. For 25 years the church was led by senior pastor and best-selling author Tim LaHaye. David Jeremiah succeeded LaHaye as senior pastor in 1981; in 1982 he launched an international radio and television ministry called Turning Point Ministry.

In 2014, Shadow Mountain Church purchased the former Grace Community Church in San Diego's North Park neighborhood and made it into an auxiliary campus named North Park Campus. As of December 2022 the church has eleven auxiliary campuses: one in El Cajon, two in San Diego, one in Encinitas, one in Chula Vista, and one in Alpine.

Ministries

The main ministry of Shadow Mountain Community Church is their Sunday service, regularly bringing in over 10,000 people a week. Another large ministry is "Mountain High Kids," the children's ministry. It is run by about a dozen full-time employees, and about 100 volunteers. Other ministries for minors include the "CREW" middle school ministry and "The Gathering" high school ministry. The church also has multiple foreign-language ministries, including a Spanish-speaking ministry, a Filipino congregation, an Iraqi ministry, and several others.

Pastor Dr. David Jeremiah records his sermons for his radio program called ''Turning Point."

References

External links 

Baptist churches in California
Southern Baptist Convention churches
Evangelical megachurches in the United States
Megachurches in California
California culture
Christian organizations established in 1909
Churches in San Diego County, California
El Cajon, California